Ryuminskoye is a rural locality (a selo) in Slednevskoye Rural Settlement, Alexandrovsky District, Vladimir Oblast, Russia. The population was 17 as of 2010. There are 4 streets.

Geography 
Ryuminskoye is located 22 km north of Alexandrov (the district's administrative centre) by road. Kopylikha is the nearest rural locality.

References 

Rural localities in Alexandrovsky District, Vladimir Oblast